Arnoud Adrianus Maria "Arno" Brok (born 29 July 1968) is a Dutch politician serving as the King's Commissioner of Friesland since 2017. A member of the People's Party for Freedom and Democracy (VVD), he previously served as Mayor of Sneek from 2003 to 2010 and Mayor of Dordrecht from 2010 until 2017.

Arno Brok is one of three openly gay politicians who served as King's Commissioner, the other two are: Clemens Cornielje, and Jan Franssen.

Decorations

See also
List of openly LGBT heads of government
List of LGBT holders of political offices in the Netherlands

References

External links
Official

  Drs. A.A.M. (Arno) Brok Parlement.com

1968 births
Living people
20th-century Dutch civil servants
20th-century Dutch politicians
21st-century Dutch politicians
Aldermen of Leeuwarden
Gay politicians
King's and Queen's Commissioners of Friesland
Knights of the Holy Sepulchre
LGBT conservatism
LGBT King's and Queen's Commissioners of the Netherlands
LGBT mayors of places in the Netherlands
Mayors in Friesland
Mayors of Dordrecht
Municipal councillors of Leeuwarden
Officers of the Order of Orange-Nassau
People from Leerdam
People from Sneek
People's Party for Freedom and Democracy politicians
University of Twente alumni